Field of Honor '15 was a professional wrestling event produced by Ring of Honor (ROH), which took place on August 22, 2015 at the MCU Park in Brooklyn, New York. Field of Honor '15 will be on ROH Wrestling.com's Home Page in the Video on Demand Section.

Storylines
Field of Honor '15 featured professional wrestling matches, involving different wrestlers from pre-existing scripted feuds, plots, and storylines that played out on ROH's television programs. Wrestlers portrayed villains or heroes as they followed a series of events that built tension and culminated in a wrestling match or series of matches.

The card also featured wrestlers from ROH's international partner New Japan Pro-Wrestling, with which they have a talent exchange agreement.

On June 19, At Best In The World 2015 Jay Lethal would defeat Jay Briscoe in the main event at the event to retain the ROH World Television Championship and begin his first reign as ROH World Champion. At the same event, reDRagon would lose against The Addiction (Christopher Daniels and Frankie Kazarian). On The July 6th, It was announced that a Dream Match would take place at Field of Honor as ROH World Champion and ROH World Television Champion Jay Lethal would team with Shinsuke Nakamura to battle both Bobby Fish and Kyle O'Reilly of reDRagon at the event.

On July 6, ROH announced that Mr. ROH Roderick Strong would battle the IWGP Heavyweight Champion Kazuchika Okada at the event. Strong previously fought Hiroshi Tanahashi, Kushida, and Shinsuke Nakamura at both War of the Worlds '15 and Global Wars '15. Strong would only capture the win over Kushida. After Strong facing three great wrestlers in New Japan Pro-Wrestling he set his sights on the IWGP Heavyweight Champion Kazuchika Okada.

On July 6, ROH announced that War Machine (Hanson and Ray Rowe) would battle Killer Elite Squad (Davey Boy Smith Jr. and Lance Hoyt) after their first match on Ring of Honor TV would end in a double disqualification.

After defeating Roppongi Vice (Baretta and Rocky Romero) at Death Before Dishonor XIII, The Briscoes (Jay Briscoe and Mark Briscoe) would set their sights on another one of New Japan Pro-Wrestling's Super Junior Tag Teams in the Time Splitters (Alex Shelley and Kushida). ROH would make the match official for Field of Honor on July 27.

After failing to win the G1 Climax Tournament in 2015 Michael Elgin would set his sights on the IWGP Intercontinental Champion Hirooki Goto at Field of Honor after Goto defeated Elgin in the G1 Climax Tournament, Elgin would be looking to pick up a win over the Intercontinental Champion

After facing reDRagon's Kyle O'Reilly in the main event of Ring of Honor Wrestling, Adam Cole and O'Reilly would be attacked by The Addiction after the attack Adam Cole and Kyle O'Reilly would reunite Future Shock one more time by defeating both Daniels and Kazarian. After the match Chris Sabin of the KRD would make the save until reDRagon's Bobby Fish make the save for Cole and O'Reilly. This would result in Adam Cole taking on one-half of the ROH World Tag Team Championship Christopher Daniels at Field of Honor

After Moose would defeat Dalton Castle, Silas Young, Caprice Coleman, Brutal Bob Evans, and Cheeseburger in a weekly episode of Ring of Honor Wrestling. The Matchmaker of ROH Nigel McGuinness would announce that Moose, Dalton Castle, and Silas Young would be put into an Eight-Man Gauntlet at Field of Honor along with Frankie Kazarian, Takaaki Watanabe, Adam Page, Cedric Alexander, and Donovan Dijak. The winner of the match will face Jay Lethal for the ROH World Television Championship at any given time.

Results

See also
ROH's annual events
2015 in professional wrestling

References

External links
 Ring of Honor's official site

2015 in professional wrestling
Events in Brooklyn, New York
2015 in New York City
Professional wrestling in New York City
August 2015 events in the United States
ROH Field of Honor